The Maxus EV30 is an electric light, commercial 4-door van designed and produced by the Chinese automaker Maxus since 2018.

Overview
The Maxus EV30 was launched on the Chinese car market in January 2019 as a mid-size electric distribution van of the Maxus brand.

Specifications

The Maxus EV30 is a standard 2-seater panel van and is equipped with a powertrain that produces 94 hp (70 kW) of power and 220 N.m (162 lb.ft) of torque powering the front wheels. The EV30 is capable of a top speed of 90 km/hr (56 mph), and accelerates to 50 km/hr in 5 seconds. The EV30 for the Chinese market is a pure electric vehicle (BEV) that is equipped with a 35 kWh battery mounted under the load floor and delivering a range of 235 km (147 miles) rated by NEDC.

As a purpose-built electric van design, the EV30 is complete with aluminium monocoque construction and a composite front end. The EV30 has a ground clearance of 145 mm (6.0 inches), and comes standard with 15 inch steel wheels. The maximum pay load capacity for the Chinese market model is 830 kg (1,830 lbs) and the load volume is 5 cubic metres. As of 2019, pricing for the Maxus EV30 in China ranges from 128,700 to 144,900 yuan before incentives. The EV30 is equipped with MacPherson strut and leaf-spring configuration that is more focused on load taking.

In selected markets, the EV30 would be offered in both short and long-wheelbase variants which carries 4.8 and 6.3 cubic metres respectively. The short and long-wheelbase variants are equivalent to traditional small and medium van segments. The short-wheelbase variant measures 4.5m with a payload of 905 kg and the long-wheelbase variant increased the wheelbase by 375mm and reaching a length of 5.1m with a payload of 1,020 kg.

Interior features
There is no choice of trim levels for the EV30. The interior has standard equipment including air conditioning, electric windows, USB & Bluetooth connectivity, storage, cup holders, adjustable electric door mirrors, a multifunction steering wheel and an eight-inch touchscreen infotainment system with support for Apple CarPlay and Android Auto for export models. Additionally, a reverse camera with rear parking sensors, cruise control, six cargo bay floor-mounted strapping rings and a cargo bay solid partition with a glass panel option to separate the cabin.

Export markets

UK market
The Maxus EV30 is sold as the Maxus eDeliver 3 in UK starting from 2020. Compared to the Chinese EV30, the eDeliver 3 is right hand drive and features barn doors for the tailgate. The Maxus eDeliver 3 vans were exported from China, and UK is the first export market to launch the vehicle.

There are two battery packs offered on the eDeliver 3 for the UK; a 35kWh and a 52.5kWh, returning a range of 98 miles and 150 miles respectively rated via the NEDC cycle. A rapid charge to around 90% of the battery takes 45 minutes, while a Type 2 full battery charge would take seven hours. Three wheelbase variants are available in UK which include a short or long wheelbase panel van and an extended wheelbase platform chassis. The short-wheelbase variant has a cargo volume of 4.8 cubic metres and a maximum payload capacity of 905 kg, while the long-wheelbase variant offers 6.3 cubic metres and 1,020 kg. Prices for the eDeliver 3 in UK start from £30,000 ex. VAT (£22,800 with the plug-in van grant, ex. VAT).

Australian market
In Australia, the Maxus EV30 is sold as the LDV EV30.

New Zealand market
In New Zealand, the Maxus EV30 is sold as the LDV eDeliver 3.

Greek market
In Greece, the Maxus EV30 is sold as the Maxus eDeliver 3.

References

External links
Official website

EV30
Vans
Electric vans
Vehicles introduced in 2019
2010s cars
2020s cars
Front-wheel-drive vehicles